Rolf Appel  (25 February 1921 – 30 January 2012)  was an inorganic chemist who worked in the area of organophosphorus chemistry

Education
Appel received his PhD at age 30. He was appointed in 1962 to both the University of Bonn along with the inorganic chemical institute in 1962 from the University of Heidelberg. He was a research assistant in Chemistry at Bonn University in Bonn, when he developed the Appel reaction. For his discovery, Appel received the Liebig Medal. In 1986, he retired from the inorganic institute. He was succeeded by Edgar Niecke.

The Appel reaction is an organic reaction that converts an alcohol into an alkyl chloride using triphenylphosphine and carbon tetrachloride.

References

20th-century German chemists
1921 births
2012 deaths